Men are Such Fools is a 1938 American romantic comedy directed by Busby Berkeley and written by Norman Reilly Raine and Horace Jackson. The film stars Wayne Morris, Priscilla Lane, Humphrey Bogart, Hugh Herbert, Johnnie Davis, and Penny Singleton. The film was released by Warner Bros. on July 16, 1938. The movie is adapted from the novel by the same name, Men Are Such Fools, by Faith Baldwin.

Plot
Linda Lawrence is an assistant to an executive Mr. Bates at a New York advertising agency called Americo. She badly wants to reach new levels in her career and strives to do her best work at Americo as to not be the traditional woman. She has a few ideas she would like to pitch to Mr. Bates in order to advance in her career, but is repeatedly interrupted by Jimmy Hall, an ex-football star now turned co-worker. Hall claims he loves her, and Lawrence entertains him and eventually does fall in love with him, however she wants her primary focus to be her career. As she tries to advance her career through hard work, Hall tries to advance on her as a love interest, and Lawrence has others after her romantically as well, such as Harry Galleon, an executive of the company who could help further her career. This romantic comedy conveys messages of female independence and wits while also showing how Lawrence balances the two, her love life and career.

Cast
 Wayne Morris as Jimmie Hall
 Priscilla Lane as Linda Lawrence
 Humphrey Bogart as Harry Galleon
 Hugh Herbert as Harvey Bates
 Johnnie Davis as Tad Turkel
 Penny Singleton as Nancy
 Mona Barrie as Bea Harris
 Vivienne Osborne as Lili Arno
 Marcia Ralston as Wanda
 Gene Lockhart as Bill Dalton 
 Kathleen Lockhart as Mrs. Dalton
 Donald Briggs as George Onslow
 Nedda Harrigan as Mrs. Nelson
 Eric Stanley as Mr. Nelson
 Claud Allister as Rudolf 
 Renie Riano as Mrs. Pinkel

References

External links 
 
 
 
 

1938 films
1938 romantic comedy films
Films directed by Busby Berkeley
Films scored by Heinz Roemheld
Warner Bros. films
American romantic comedy films
American black-and-white films
1930s American films